FPDA may refer to:

Feminist post-structuralist discourse analysis, a method of discourse analysis
Five Power Defence Arrangements, a series of defence relationships established by a series of bilateral agreements between the United Kingdom, Australia, New Zealand, Malaysia and Singapore
Flexible Premium Deferred Annuity, a type of life annuity where multiple premiums may be made in the deferral period